Kanaka Vijayalakshmi, known by her stage name Madhavi is an Indian actress known for her works in Malayalam,Telugu, Hindi, Tamil and Kannada films. In a career spanning of almost 2 decades she has been featured in around 300 films and was hailed as one of the leading actresses of South Indian cinema in the 1980s.

Early life 
Madhavi was born in Hyderabad, India to Sasirekha and Govindaswamy. She grew up with a sister and a brother, named Keerthi Kumari and Dhananjay respectively. She learnt Bharat Natyam from Uma Maheswari and folk dance from Bhatt from an early age and gave more than a thousand dance performances. She attended Stanley Girls High School in Hyderabad, Abids Branch.

Career 
Director Dasari Narayana Rao gave her a starring role in the Telugu film Thoorupu Padamara when she was a teenager. The film became a huge hit.
She acted in a number of films with Telugu actor Chiranjeevi. Her first movie with Chiranjeevi was Intlo Ramayya Veedhilo Krishnayya in 1982. She acted again with Chiranjeevi in the movie Khaidi which was a massive hit. Her last movie in Telugu was Big Boss (another Chiranjeevi film). K. Balachander then cast her in a supporting role in his Telugu film Maro Charitra (1978). She reprised her role in its Hindi remake Ek Duuje Ke Liye (1981), which became the top-grossing film of 1981. In both films, she played a lonely wealthy woman who falls in love with Kamal Haasan's character. She earned a Filmfare Award nomination as Best Supporting Actress. K. Balachander introduced her to the Tamil film industry with Thillu Mullu (1981), opposite Rajinikanth. By the end of the decade, she starred opposite Amitabh Bachchan in the Hindi film Agneepath (1990).

She appeared in many Malayalam films especially in those starring Mohanlal and Mammootty. She portrayed Unniyarcha in the National Award-winning movie Oru Vadakkan Veeragadha. Her portrayal as a mother who dies of leukemia in Akashadoothu won her the Kerala State Film Award for Second Best Actress and Filmfare Award for Best Actress for 1993. Other films include Ormakkayi, Changatham, Novemberinte Nashtam and Nombarathi Poovu.

She has acted in many Kannada movies alongside Kannada actors including Dr. Rajkumar, Vishnuvardhan, Anant Nag and Ambareesh. With Rajkumar she acted in many movies including Haalu Jenu, Bhagyada Lakshmi Baramma, Anuraga Aralithu, Shruthi Seridaaga, Jeevana Chaitra, Aakasmika, Odahuttidavaru, Haalu Jenu and Malaya Marutha.

Madhavi acted alongside Kamal Haasan in Raja Paarvai, Tik Tik Tik, Kaakki Sattai, Sattam, Ellam Inba mayam and Mangamma Sabadham. Her films with Rajinikanth include Garjanai, Thillu Mullu, Thambikku Entha Ooru, Un Kannil Neer Vazhindal and Viduthalai. She was in Enga Oor Kannagi, Neethi Devan Mayakkam and Nirabaraadhi.
 
Most of her author-backed roles were in Malayalam films. She has won three Kerala State Film Awards, one for Best Actress and two for Second Best Actress.

Personal life 
In 1996, her Hindu spiritual teacher Swami Rama arranged her marriage to one of his followers, a pharmaceutical businessman named Ralph Sharma. Ralph first met Swami Rama at the age of 32 at the Himalayan Institute of Yoga Science and Philosophy., and Madhavi first met him in 1995. They were married on 14 February 1996. They have three daughters and live in New Jersey.

Awards and honours

Partial filmography 

In order of languages from most to fewest films

Telugu

Malayalam 

Complete list of Madhavi's Malayalam Movies are available from the MSI Database.

Hindi

Tamil

Kannada

References

External links 
 Official website
 

Living people
Actresses in Telugu cinema
Actresses in Malayalam cinema
Actresses from Hyderabad, India
Actresses in Tamil cinema
Actresses in Kannada cinema
Kerala State Film Award winners
Filmfare Awards South winners
Actresses in Odia cinema
Indian film actresses
20th-century Indian actresses
Year of birth missing (living people)